"Whiggle in Line" is a song by Italian group Black Duck, released as their only single in December 1994. It is an electronic Eurodance style take on "Saturday Night" by Danish/Italian act Whigfield. Produced by Davide Riva and Larry Pignagnoli, the producers of the original track, it has an added ragga rap element and slightly different female vocals to the original, which is performed by British singer and TV host Carryl Varley, who also used to front Italian band Jinny. The single was a notable hit in several countries, peaking at number 11 on the Canadian RPM Dance/Urban chart and number 20 in Denmark. In the UK, it reached the top 40, peaking at number 33, but on the UK Dance Chart it fared better, reaching a respectable number 12. It also enjoyed modest airplay in the US.

Critical reception
In his weekly UK chart commentary, James Masterton wrote, "Repeated plays brought a dose of much-needed hilarity to the office along with the conclusion that it could never be a hit. Clearly we were wrong. With "Saturday Night" easily the second biggest seller of the year it was inevtiable that a parody would end up being made." He added, "The whole thing is clearly intended as a bit of seasonal fun, even to the extent of requesting donations for duck sanctuaries on the sleeve. Pop music is supposed to be about having fun after all..." 

Alan Jones from Music Week noted that Whigfield's debut single "has been turned into an even sillier song than the original", as "a tongue-in-cheek remake, which retains large portions of the original, and adds some ragga to the mix. Released on Flying South, it's another potential hit" James Hamilton from the RM Dance Update described it as a "useful 130bpm copy of Whigfield's 'Saturday Night' (including quacks) but with an added surprisingly credible gruff ragga rap". Mark Frith from Smash Hits gave it three out of five, calling it "a bizarre novelty record". He added, "The question is, is it a real duck?"

Music video
The accompanying music video for "Whiggle in Line" was directed by B. Duck and features a dancing stuffed black duck, hence the group's name. It also features a rapper and Carryl Varley. The video was later published on YouTube in February 2018.

Track listing
 12", Italy (1994)
"Whiggle in Line" (Peking Krispy Klub Mix) — 7:13
"Whiggle in Line" (7" Mallard Mix) — 3:36
"Migration" (Little Fluffy Ducks Mix) — 4:44
"Whiggle in Line" (Daffy Dub) — 4:33

 CD single, UK (1994)
"Whiggle in Line" (7" Mallard Mix)	
"Whiggle in Line" (Peking Krispy Klub Mix)	
"Whiggle in Line" (Daffy Dub)
"Migration" (Little Fluffy Ducks Mix)

 CD single, France (1995)
"Whiggle in Line" (7" Mallard Mix) — 3:37
"Whiggle in Line" (Daffy Dub) — 4:34

Charts

References

 

1994 debut singles
1994 songs
Dance-pop songs
English-language Italian songs
Eurodance songs